Richard Sommer (1929? - 2009) American winemaker, considered the father of the Oregon wine industry.

After graduating in 1957 in agronomy from the University of California, Davis, Sommer moved to Douglas County, Oregonto pursue fine winemaking. First, he found employment in the county assessor’s office and in 1961 established Hillcrest vineyards on 20 acres of land near the Callahan Ridge. Sommer came north to primarily produce Pinot Noir and Riesling, but in addition planted a number of other varieties including Malbec, Sauvignon Blanc, Semilliion, Chardonnay, Grenache, Barbera etc. Later Richard would be recognized as the first to plant(1961) and produce (1967) Pinot Noir in Oregon. All of these cuttings had been collected in 1959, from Louis Martini’s Stanly Ranch Vineyard in Carneros, California with the exception of Zinfandel which had been sourced locally from the Doerner family who had come to the Umpqua Valley from Nap in the 1880's.

Sommer sold Hillcrest Vineyards in 2003 to Dyson and Susan DeMara.

University of California, Davis alumni